The Women's shot put event at the 2011 World Championships in Athletics was held at the Daegu Stadium on August 28 and 29.

There were two main contenders for the gold medal: New Zealander Valerie Vili (who returned to using her maiden name of Adams following her 2010 divorce) and Nadzeya Astapchuk of Belarus. Adams, with four straight wins on the Diamond League circuit, entered the competition as the defending champion and reigning Olympic champion. Astapchuk was the only other woman to have thrown over 20.50 m that season and held the world leading mark of 20.94 m. Other in-form throwers included Americans Jillian Camarena-Williams and Michelle Carter, and Chinese athletes Gong Lijiao and Li Ling. The 2009 silver medallist Nadine Kleinert and 2008 Olympic runner-up Natallia Mikhnevich were present, but neither had performed to a high standard that year.

Having already clearly won the final, Adams relaxed and let loose a put of 21.24 on her final throw.  While it only elevated her to 22nd on the all-time list, it was the best throw since Larisa Peleshenko in 2000.  It was obviously her personal best and annual world leader, it was also the New Zealand national record and Oceana area record.  It also equalled the championship record from 1987.  Previous world leader Nadzeya Astapchuk came through in the fifth round with a 20.05 put, to edge past Jillian Camarena-Williams.

Medalists

Records
Prior to the competition, the established records were as follows.

Qualification standards

Schedule

Results

Qualification
Qualification: Qualifying Performance 18.65 (Q) or at least 12 best performers (q) advance to the final.

Final

References

External links
Shot put results at IAAF website

Shot put
Shot put at the World Athletics Championships
2011 in women's athletics